Michael, Prince of Saxe-Weimar-Eisenach  (born 15 November 1946) is the current head of the Grand Ducal House of Saxe-Weimar-Eisenach, as well as the most senior agnate of the entire House of Wettin.

Prince of Saxe-Weimar-Eisenach
Prince Michael was born in Bamberg, Bavaria, the only son of Hereditary Grand Duke Charles Augustus of Saxe-Weimar-Eisenach and Baroness Elisabeth von Wangenheim-Winterstein (1912–2010). Among his godparents were Queen Juliana of the Netherlands and the Grand Duchess Anastasia of Russia imposter, Anna Anderson, who was living with his aunt Princess Luise of Saxe-Meiningen.

When his father died on 14 October 1988, Prince Michael succeeded him as Head of the House of Saxe-Weimar-Eisenach. On 13 February 1991, he inherited the leadership in the House of Saxe-Altenburg, as that line became extinct, and since 23 July 2012 he regards the Albertine royal Saxon line to be extinct. However, Prince Michael has also stated that he "[does not] believe in historical carnival" and that "Germany should have done it like Austria long ago and abolished all titles."

In 2004, he withdrew his claim for restitution of numerous properties, archives (partly including those of Schiller and Goethe) as well as priceless artwork in a settlement with the Free State of Thuringia and acquired some forest estates in exchange.

Since Prince Michael has no sons, the current heir to the headship of the grand ducal house is his elder (by age) first cousin, Prince Wilhelm Ernst (b. 10 August 1946), whose only son Prince Georg-Constantin (13 April 1977 – 9 June 2018), a banker who was married but without issue, was killed in a horse riding accident on 9 June 2018 while riding with Jean Christophe Iseux von Pfetten. Therefore, the Grand Ducal House of Saxe-Weimar-Eisenach will most likely become extinct in the male line.

Marriages
Prince Michael married Renate Henkel (b. Heidelberg, 17 September 1947), daughter of industrialist Konrad Henkel and wife Jutta von Hülsen and sister of Christoph Henkel, in a civil ceremony on 9 June 1970 at Hamburg-Eimsbüttel, and religiously on 4 July 1970 at Linnep bei Breitscheid. The marriage was childless and dissolved by divorce at Düsseldorf on 9 March 1974.

He was married secondly to Dagmar Hennings (b. Niederpöcking, 24 June 1948), daughter of Henrich Hennings and wife Margarethe Schacht, in London on 15 November 1980. They have one daughter: 
Leonie Mercedes Augusta Silva Elisabeth Margarethe of Saxe-Weimar-Eisenach (b. Frankfurt, 30 October 1986). She graduated with her Abitur from high school at Schule Schloss Salem, where she became involved in theatre and hockey and was a Student Representative (Schulsprecher), between 2001 and 2006, after which she obtained a Bachelor's degree in Media and Cultural Studies from the University of the Arts London from 2007 to 2010. Meanwhile, she was employed as an Intern Photographer of Contemporary Art for Sotheby's London between January and June 2007, as an Intern for "BILD" at Axel Springer SE at Frankfurt and surrounding area in September 2008, as an Intern at "Tatler" in April 2009 and then as an Intern for "Vogue Russia" in June 2009 both at Condé Nast International, and then again at Axel Springer SE as an Intern at the Editorial Team of "ICON Welt am Sonntag" at Berlin and surrounding area in September 2009. After graduating, she worked at n-tv The News Channel - Der Nachrichtensender, firstly as an Intern between August and December 2010 and then as a Title Editor and Reporter between January 2011 and December 2013, both of the Editorial Office "5th Avenue", after which she went to Media Group RTL Germany, where she worked firstly as an Editor and Reporter at the RTL "Punkt 12 VIP" between January and October 2014 and afterwards as an Editor and Reporter at the RTL "Capital Studio People" and Lifestyle Editorial Office at Berlin and surrounding area since November 2014.

Honours and awards

Nongovernmental organizations 
 Slovakia, Servare et Manere

  Memorial Medal of Tree of Peace, Special class with rubies, (May 12, 2022).

Ancestry

References

|-

1946 births
Living people
People from Bamberg
House of Saxe-Weimar-Eisenach
Princes of Saxe-Weimar-Eisenach